Charles Davis (January 1, 1789 – November 21, 1863) was a Vermont attorney and judge who served as an associate justice of the Vermont Supreme Court from 1846 to 1847.

Biography
Charles Davis was born in Mansfield, Connecticut on January 1, 1789, the son of Philip Davis (d. 1822) and Christiana (Crosby) Davis.  Philip Davis moved his family to Rockingham, Vermont in 1792, and Middlebury, Vermont in 1806. Davis was educated in Rockingham and Middlebury, and in 1808 was admitted to the sophomore class at Middlebury College. He graduated in 1811, and began to study law with Daniel Chipman.

Davis edited the Vermont Mirror, a newspaper opposed to the War of 1812, but also served in the Vermont Militia when Vermont was threatened by a British invasion from Canada.  He was admitted to the bar in 1814, and practiced in Middlebury until moving to Barton in 1816.  In 1818, he moved to Waterford, and in 1828 he moved to Danville.  In 1828, Davis was elected State's Attorney of Caledonia County, and he served until 1834.  In 1831, Davis served as Clerk of the Vermont House of Representatives.  He returned to the State's Attorney position in 1838, and served until 1839.

Davis became a Whig when the party was founded.  When Whig nominee William Henry Harrison won the presidency in 1841, Davis was appointed United States Attorney for the District of Vermont; he served until 1845, when he became Judge of the Caledonia County Probate Court. He served until 1846, when he was appointed to the Vermont Supreme Court.  He was a member of the Supreme Court until 1848, when he resumed the practice of law in Danville. In 1851, he was elected to the Vermont House of Representatives, and served one term.

Retirement and death
In retirement, Davis and his wife moved to Rockford, Illinois, where they resided with their son Isaac Fletcher Davis. Charles Davis died in Rockford on November 21, 1863. He was buried at Cedar Bluff Cemetery in Rockford.

Family
In 1814, Davis married Lucinda Stone of Chesterfield, New Hampshire (d. 1884).  They were the parents of five children: Charles; Philip; Norman; Isaac Fletcher; and Ellen.

References

Sources

Books

Internet

External links

1789 births
1863 deaths
People from Mansfield, Connecticut
People from Caledonia County, Vermont
Politicians from Rockford, Illinois
Military personnel from Vermont
Middlebury College alumni
American militiamen in the War of 1812
U.S. state supreme court judges admitted to the practice of law by reading law
Vermont lawyers
State's attorneys in Vermont
Vermont Whigs
Vermont state court judges
Justices of the Vermont Supreme Court
Members of the Vermont House of Representatives
Burials in Illinois
19th-century American judges
19th-century American lawyers